Al-Muwatta may refer to:

Muwatta Imam Malik by Malik ibn Anas
Muwatta Imam Muhammad by Muhammad al-Shaybani